David Starr Jordan (January 19, 1851 – September 19, 1931) was the founding president of Stanford University, serving from 1891 to 1913. He was an ichthyologist during his research career. Prior to serving as president of Stanford University, he had served as president of Indiana University from 1884 to 1891.

Starr was also a strong supporter of eugenics, and his published views expressed a fear of "race-degeneration" and asserted that cattle and human beings are "governed by the same laws of selection". He was an antimilitarist since he believed that war killed off the best members of the gene pool, and he initially opposed American involvement in World War I. Both of these beliefs may have been in part shaped by the death of his close older brother, Rufus Bacon Jordan, in 1862 from a 'camp fever', likely typhoid, immediately after enlisting to fight in the American civil war.

Early life and career
Jordan was born in Gainesville, New York, and grew up on a farm in upstate New York. His parents made the unorthodox decision to educate him at a local girls' high school. His middle name, Starr, does not appear in early census records, and was apparently self-selected; he had begun using it by the time that he was enrolled at Cornell. He said that it was in honor of his mother's devotion to the minister Thomas Starr King.

He was inspired by Louis Agassiz to pursue his studies in ichthyology. He was part of the pioneer class of undergraduates at Cornell University and graduated in 1872 with a master's degree in botany.

He wrote in his autobiography The Days of a Man, "During the three years which followed [my entrance as a 'belated' freshman in March 1869], I completed all the requirements for a degree of Bachelor of Science, besides about two year of advanced work in Botany. Taking this last into consideration, the faculty conferred on me at graduation in June 1872, the advanced degree of Master of Science instead of the conventional Bachelor's Degree ... it was afterward voted not to grant any second degree within a year after the Bachelor had been received. I was placed, quite innocently, in the position of being the only graduate of Cornell to merge two degrees into one."

His master's thesis was on the topic "The Wild Flowers of Wyoming County".

Jordan initially taught natural history courses at several small Midwestern colleges and secondary schools.

Jordan obtained a medical degree, M.D., from Indiana Medical College in 1875. The Indiana Medical College in Indianapolis had opened in 1869 and closed its doors in 1878, and has no relation to any other past or extant medical school in Indiana. 

He wrote in his autobiography that while teaching at Indianapolis High School, "I was also able to spend some time in the Medical College, from which, in the spring of 1875, I received the (scarcely earned) degree of Doctor of Medicine, though it had not at all been my intention to enter that profession." Jordan taught comparative anatomy at the college the following year (1876). (An unrelated history of American medicine observes: “Once a university was closed, it was difficult to ascertain whether someone actually graduated from it.”)

He was then accepted into the natural history faculty of Indiana University Bloomington as a professor of zoology in 1879. His teaching included his version of eugenics, which "sought to prevent the decay of the Anglo-Saxon/Nordic race by limiting racial mixing and by preventing the reproduction of those he deemed unfit."

Personal life

Jordan married Susan Bowen (1845–1885), a biologist and a graduate of Mount Holyoke College (whom he had met at Louis Agassiz's Penikese Island Summer School of Science), in her hometown of Peru, Massachusetts on March 10, 1875. She died at age 39, after 10 years of marriage, following a brief illness. Bowen was six years Jordan's senior.

They had three children: the educator Edith Monica (1877–1965), Harold Bowen (1882–1959), and Thora (1884–1886).

Jordan later married Jessie Knight (1866–1952) in 1887. At the time of their marriage, two years after his first wife's death, Knight was 21 years old and Jordan was 36. They met while he was serving as president of Indiana University. He and his second wife had three additional children: Knight Starr (1888–1947), Barbara (1891–1900), and Eric Knight (1903–1926).

Indiana University presidency
In 1885, he was named president of Indiana University and became the nation's youngest university president at only 34 and the first Indiana University president who was not an ordained minister.

He improved the university's finances and public image, doubled its enrollment, and instituted an elective system; like Cornell's, it was an early application of the modern liberal arts curriculum.

Stanford presidency
In March 1891, he was approached by Leland and Jane Stanford, who offered him the presidency of Leland Stanford Junior University, which was about to open in California. Andrew White, the president of Cornell, had been offered the position but instead recommended Jordan to the Stanfords based on an educational philosophy fit with the Stanfords' vision of a nonsectarian co-educational school with a liberal arts curriculum. Jordan quickly accepted the offer, arrived at Stanford in June 1891, and immediately set about recruiting faculty for the university's planned September opening. Pressed for time, he drew heavily on his own acquaintances; most of the 15 founding professors came either from Cornell or Indiana University. That first year at Stanford, Jordan was instrumental in establishing the university's Hopkins Marine Station. He served Stanford as president until 1913 and then chancellor until his retirement in 1916. The university decided not to renew his three-year-term as chancellor in 1916. As the years went on, Jordan became increasingly alienated from the university.

While he was chancellor, he was elected president of the National Education Association. Jordan was a member in the Bohemian Club and the University Club in San Francisco. Jordan served as a director of the Sierra Club from 1892 to 1903. He was one of the first professors to build a summer home on Dolores Street, on what became known as "Professors' Row" in Carmel-by-the-Sea, California in 1904.

Eugenics 
In 1899, Jordan delivered an essay at Stanford on behalf of racial segregation and racial purity. In the essay, Jordan claimed that "For a race of men or a herd of cattle are governed by the same laws of selection." Jordan expressed great fears and phobias for "race degeneration" that would result unless great endeavors were put forward to maintain "racial unity".

Eugenics-based argument against war
One of Jordan's main theses in the essay was that his goals for an ideal society are better engendered by peace than war. His argument against warfare contended that it is detrimental because it removes the strongest men from the gene pool. Jordan asserted, "Future war is impossible because the nations cannot afford it." As one commentator put it, "Though he found meager evidence to support his preconceptions, he still confidently asserted that 'always and everywhere, war means the reversal of natural selection.

Jordan was president of the World Peace Foundation from 1910 to 1914 and president of the World Peace Conference in 1915 and initially opposed American entry into World War I although he changed his position in 1917 after he became convinced that a German victory would threaten democracy.

Multiple publications of essay
Soon after it was first delivered, the essay was published by the American Unitarian Association (copyright 1902) under the main title of "The Blood of the Nation" and a subtitle of "A Study of the Decay of Races Through the Survival of the Unfit". Multiple editions of that version followed over the next few years.

An expanded version of the essay was delivered in Philadelphia at the 200th anniversary of Benjamin Franklin's birth in 1906 and printed by the American Philosophical Society. The following year, an expanded version of the original essay with an embossed cover was published by Beacon Press in Boston under the new main title "The Human Harvest" and the same subtitle. This new version was dedicated to Jordan's older brother Rufus, who had volunteered to fight in the American Civil War and, according to Jordan, was part of the "'Human Harvest' of 1862". 

In 1910, the original and slimmer version of the essay was again published by the American Unitarian Association in a "present less expensive form to insure the widest possible distribution."

In 1915, Jordan published an "extended treatise on the same subject" titled War and Breed and again through the Beacon Press in Boston. Here Jordan defines and begins to employ the relatively recent term "eugenics" and its opposite "dysgenics".

Influential role
In 1928 Jordan served on the initial board of trustees of the Human Betterment Foundation, a eugenics organization that advocated compulsory sterilization legislation in the United States. He then chaired the first Committee on Eugenics of the American Breeder's Association from which the California program of forced deportation and sterilization emerged. Jordan then went on to help found the Human Betterment Foundation as a trustee. The foundation published Sterilization for Human Betterment.

Role in apparent coverup of murder of Jane Stanford
In 1905, Jordan launched an apparent coverup of the murder of Jane Stanford. While vacationing in Oahu, Stanford had suddenly died of strychnine poisoning according to the local coroner's jury. Jordan then sailed to Hawaii, hired a physician to investigate the case, and declared she had in fact died of heart failure, a condition whose symptoms bear no relationship to those that were actually observed. His motive for doing this has been a subject of speculation. One possibility is that he was simply acting to protect the reputation of the university since its finances were precarious, and a scandal might have damaged fundraising. He had written the president of Stanford's board of trustees, offered several alternate explanations for Mrs. Stanford's death, and suggested to select whichever would be most suitable. Since Mrs. Stanford had a difficult relationship with him and reportedly planned to remove him from his position at the university, he might also have had a personal motive to eliminate suspicions that might have swirled around an unsolved crime. Jordan's version of Mrs. Stanford's demise was largely accepted until the appearance of several publications in 2003 that emphasized the evidence that she was murdered.

Final years and legacy
In retirement, Jordan remained active, writing on ichthyology, world relations, peace, and his autobiography.

Lifetime honors and awards
 1877 Honorary Ph.D. awarded by Butler University
 1886 Honorary LL.D. awarded by Cornell University
 1902 Honorary LL.D. awarded by Johns Hopkins University
 1909 Honorary LL.D. awarded by Indiana University

Skepticism
Although a proponent of eugenics, Jordan was skeptical of certain other pseudoscientific claims. He coined the term "sciosophy" to describe the "systematized ignorance" of the pseudoscientist. His later work, The Higher Foolishness, inspired the philosopher Martin Gardner to write his treatise on scientific skepticism, Fads and Fallacies in the Name of Science. However, Gardner noted that "the book is infuriating because although Jordan mentions the titles of dozens of crank works, from which he quotes extensively, he seldom tells you the names of the authors."

Children
His daughters Thora (1884-1886) and Barbara (1891–1900) died in childhood.

His son, Eric Knight Jordan (1903–1926), died at 22 in a traffic accident near Gilroy, California. Eric had participated in a paleontological expedition to the Revillagigedo Islands and was considering an academic career.

Death
On September 19, 1931, Jordan died at his home on the Stanford campus after he had suffered a series of strokes over two years.

Monuments and memorials

Geographical landmarks
Jordan Lake in Utah's Uinta Mountains at 
Jordan commented that it was not the first mountain named in his honor since the first such mountain did not retain his name since it already had a name.

In July 2020, the president of the Sierra Club denounced Jordan and its other early leaders for being "vocal advocates for white supremacy and its pseudo-scientific arm, eugenics." The president also announced, "We will also spend the next year studying our history and determining which of our monuments need to be renamed or pulled down entirely." It is not yet clear how their reassessment would affect the status of Mount Jordan, which the club had helped to name in 1926, or that of other geographic features that bear Jordan's name.

Namesake Tree
The David Starr Jordan "Namesake Tree" at the University of Hawai‘i at Mānoa Campus Arboretum, an Indian rubber tree (Ficus elastica) was given to Jordan at the outset of a trip to Japan, and planted by him on December 11, 1922, now listed as an Exceptional Tree of Hawai‘i.

Fishery research vessel
In 1966, the fisheries research ship David Starr Jordan was commissioned for service with the United States Fish and Wildlife Services Bureau of Commercial Fisheries. The ship later served in the National Oceanic and Atmospheric Administration fleet as NOAAS David Starr Jordan (R 444) before it was decommissioned in 2010 and sold to a private company, who renamed it the R/V Ocean Starr.

Schools named or formerly named for David Starr Jordan

During the 20th century several schools were named after him or in his honor. However, most of them were renamed in the 21st century, as his eugenics activities became well known.
 Jordan Middle School in Palo Alto, California, established in 1937, was renamed in 2018 for African-American memory chip inventor Frank S. Greene.
 David Starr Jordan Middle School in Burbank, California, established in the 1940s, was renamed in 2021 for labor leader and civil rights activist Dolores Huerta. 
 Jordan High School in Long Beach, California, established in 1934, was still named for him when the school district last explored its possible renaming in mid-2020. , this is the only public school that still honors Jordan.
 David Starr Jordan High School in Los Angeles, California, was established in 1923; in 2020 the name was shortened to Jordan High School to remove the reference to him while keeping "Jordan" as a generic legacy name for alumni.

University campus buildings
Jordan was closely associated with Indiana University and Stanford University, and both schools named buildings and other campus features after him. However, as his reputation became more controversial in the 2000s, they acted to remove Jordan's name from their respective campuses.

Stanford honored its former president in 1917 by renaming its zoology building, built in 1899, to Jordan Hall. Other campus features were named Jordan Quad, Jordan Modulars, and Jordan Way. In October 2020 the Stanford Board of Trustees voted unanimously, on the recommendation of an advisory committee, to remove Jordan's name from all four facilities. The former Jordan Hall was to be referred to as Building 420 until a permanent name could be selected sometime the following year. Stanford President Marc Tessier-Lavigne was charged to rename Jordan Quad and Jordan Modulars. The advisory committee recommended that the renaming of Jordan Way, a street on the medical campus, "may take place during the course of ongoing construction and planning."

When Indiana University built a new building for its biology department in 1956, the building was named in honor of Jordan, its former president and biology faculty member. In October 2020 the Indiana University Board of Trustees voted overwhelmingly to remove Jordan's name from the biology building as well as a parking garage and a "river" (actually a small creek) that runs through the center of the campus. Jordan's name was stripped from these places immediately after the trustee meeting had concluded, and they were given temporary, generic names to be used until permanent names could be selected the following year. Jordan Hall, the Jordan River and the Jordan Avenue Parking Garage became respectively the Biology Building, the Campus River, and the East Parking Garage. In August 2021, staff members of the Biology Department sent a petition to the new IU President Pamela Whitten urging the university leadership to rename the Biology Building in honor of James P. Holland, an African-American IU alumnus, award-winning former faculty member and endocrinologist who died in 1998.

IU President Michael McRobbie requested the University Naming Committee to work with the city of Bloomington to find a name as a replacement for Jordan Avenue, a thoroughfare that is owned in part by IU and in part by the city. , there were calls in the Bloomington City Council for Jordan Avenue to be renamed. In April 2021, the Mayor of Bloomington created a seven-member task force to investigate possible replacement names for Jordan Avenue. In September 2021, the City of Bloomington Plan Commission announced that it approved the renaming of Jordan Avenue to Eagleson Avenue while IU is in the process of renaming its section of the street to Fuller Lane pending approval by the IU Renaming Committee and the IU Board of Trustees. The city planned to complete their street renaming by February 2022. Both new street names honor prominent African-American families who moved to Bloomington after being born into slavery. In December 2021, the IU Board of Trustees reconsidered their decision to rename the university's section of the street as Fuller Lane by adopting Eagleson Avenue as the new name for the University-owned section of Jordan Avenue.

, the Indiana University South Bend campus has a scholarship named in honor of Jordan that enables its students to study outside of the United States for a short period.

Cornell's David Starr Jordan Prize (1986–2020)
Starting in 1986, the David Starr Jordan Prize was funded as a joint endowment by Cornell University, Indiana University, and Stanford. Every three years it was awarded to a young scientist (under 40 years) who made contributions in one of Jordan's interests of evolution, ecology, population or organismal biology. The prize was last awarded in 2015 to a biology professor at the University of Texas at Austin.

As Jordan's reputation became more controversial due to his support of eugenics, and particularly after the removal of Jordan's name from buildings on the campuses of Stanford and Indiana universities in 2020, there were calls to rename the prize. The prize was officially discontinued in 2020 and the endowment funds were returned to their respective universities.

Papers
Jordan's papers are housed at Stanford University and at Swarthmore College.

Works

Books
 
 
 (1882). Synopsis of the Fishes of North America.
 (1885). A Catalogue of the Fishes Known to Inhabit the Waters of North America.
 (1887). Science Sketches.
 (1888). The Value of Higher Education.
 (1895). The Factors in Organic Evolution.
 (1895). The Fishes of Puget Sound.
 (1895). The Fishes of Sinaloa.
 
 
 (1896–1900). The Fishes of North and Middle America [four vols.]
 (1897). Matka and Kotik.
 (1898). The Fur Seals and Fur-Seal Islands of the North Pacific Ocean.
 
 (1899). The Book of Knight and Barbara.
 
 
 
 (1899). The True Basis of Economics [with J.H. Stallard].
 (1900). Animal Life: A First Book of Zoology [with Vernon L. Kellog].
 
 (1902). American Food and Game Fishes [with B. W. Evermann]
 (1902). Animal Forms: A Text-Book of Zoology.
 
 
 (1903). Animal Studies [with Vernon L. Kellog and Harold Heath].
 (1903). The Training of a Physician.
 (1903). The Voice of the Scholar.
 (1904). The Wandering Host.
 (1905). The Aquatic Resources of the Hawaiian Islands.
 (1905). A Guide to the Study of Fishes.
 (1905). The Fish Fauna of the Tortugas Archipelago [with Dr. Joseph Cheesman Thompson, published for the US Bureau of Fisheries].
 (1906). The Fishes of Samoa.
 (1906). Life's Enthusiasms.
 (1907). The Alps of King-Kern Divide.
 (1907). The California Earthquake of 1906.
 (1907). College and the Man.
 (1907). Evolution and Animal Life [with Vernon L. Kellog].
 (1907). Fishes.
 (1907). Fishes of the Islands of Luzon and Panay.
  (An expansion of The Blood of a Nation.)
 (1908). Description of Three New Species of Carangoid Fishes from Formosa.
 (1908). The Fate of Iciodorum.
 (1908). Fish Stories: Alleged and Experienced.
 (1908). The Higher Sacrifice.
 (1908). The Scientific Aspects of Luther Burbank's Work [with Vernon L. Kellog].
 (1909). A Catalog of the Fishes of Formosa.
 (1909). The Religion of a Sensible American.
 (1909). Fish stories alleged and experienced, with a little history natural and unnatural [with Charles Frederick Holder] 
 
 (1910). Check-List of Species of Fishes Known from the Philippine Archipelago [with Robert Earl Richardson].
 (1910). Leading American Men of Science.
 (1910). The Woman and the University.
 (1910). Work of the International Fisheries Commission of Great Britain and the United States.
 
 (1911). The Stability of Truth.
 (1912). The Practical Education.
 (1912). The Story of a Good Woman: Jane Lathrop Stanford.
 (1912). Syllabus of Lectures on International Conciliation.
 (1912). Unseen Empire.
 (1912). "The Initiative and Referendum". The National Economic League. Boston, MA
 (1913). America's Conquest of Europe.
 (1913). A Catalog of the Fishes Known from the Waters of Korea.
 (1913). Naval Waste.
 (1913). War and Waste.
 (1913). What Shall We Say? 
 (1914). Record of Fishes Obtained in Japan in 1911.
 (1914). War's Aftermath [with Harvey Ernest Jordan].
 
  A further extended and updated version of earlier works The Blood of a Nation and The Human Harvest.
 
 
 (1916). World Peace and the College Man. 
 (1917). The Genera of Fishes.
 (1918). Democracy and World Relations.
 (1919). Fossil Fishes of Southern California.
 (1919). Studies in Ichthyology [with Carl Leavitt Hubbs]. 
 (1920). Fossil Fishes of Diatom Beds of Lompoc, California.
 (1922). Days of a Man [autobiography in two volumes]
 
 
 
 
 (1929). Your Family Tree.

Selected articles

Miscellany

Eponymy

Numerous genera and species bear the name Jordan.

Genera:
Jordania , Davidijordania , and Jordanella 

Species:

 Agonomalus jordani .
 Agonomalus jordani .
 Allocareproctus jordani .
 Astyanax jordani .
 Coelorinchus jordani .
 Caulophryne jordani .
 Chimaera jordani .
 Charal, Chirostoma jordani .
 Jordan's tuskfish, Choerodon jordani .
 Flame wrasse, Cirrhilabrus jordani .
 Smooth lumpfish, Cyclopteropsis jordani .
 Diplacanthopoma jordani .
 Dusisiren jordani .
 Mimic triplefin, Enneanectes jordani .
 Petrale sole, Eopsetta jordani .
 Greenbreast darter, Etheostoma jordani .
 Gadella jordani .
 Yellow Irish lord, Hemilepidotus jordani .
 Brokenline lanternfish, Lampanyctus jordani .
 Legionella jordanis 
 Jordan's snapper, Lutjanus jordani .
 Shortjaw eelpout, Lycenchelys jordani .
 Malthopsis jordani .
 Gulf grouper, Mycteroperca jordani .
 Neosalanx jordani .
 Patagonotothen jordani .
 Ptychidio jordani .
 Northern ronquil, Ronquilus jordani .
 Shortbelly rockfish, Sebastes jordani .
 Jordan's damsel, Teixeirichthys jordani .
 Jordan's sculpin, Triglops jordani .

See also
:Category:Taxa named by David Starr Jordan

References

Further reading

External links

 
 
 
Works by David Starr Jordan, at JSTOR
Works by David Starr Jordan, at Hathi Trust
History of Stanford motto, with Jordan bio info
  Biography, Smithsonian website
Cover of Time magazine, June 8, 1931
David Starr Jordan papers, 1874-1929, Indiana University Archives
Indiana University President's Office records, 1884-1891, Indiana University Archives

American ichthyologists
1851 births
1931 deaths
Activists from California
American autobiographers
American eugenicists
American science writers
American skeptics
American social sciences writers
American taxonomists
Sierra Club directors
Presidents of Stanford University
Presidents of Indiana University
American anti-war activists
Cornell University College of Agriculture and Life Sciences alumni
Indiana University School of Medicine alumni
People from Gainesville, New York
Scientists from California
19th-century American male writers
19th-century American scientists
19th-century American writers
20th-century American non-fiction writers
19th-century American zoologists
20th-century American zoologists
20th-century American male writers
American male non-fiction writers
Indiana University faculty
Racial segregation